The year 1908 in archaeology involved some significant events.

Explorations
 January: Skeleton Cave (Arizona) rediscovered, containing remains of Yavapai massacred in the Battle of Salt River Canyon (1872).

Excavations
 At Avebury in Wiltshire, England, by Harold St George Gray.
 At Knap Hill in Wiltshire, the first excavation of a causewayed enclosure, begun by Ben and Maud Cunnington.
 First excavations at Samaria begun by a Harvard expedition.
 Sakçagözü excavated by John Garstang.
 Ulugh Beg Observatory is discovered in Samarkand by Russian archaeologist V. L. Vyatkin, having been partly destroyed in 1449.

Publications
 A. Hadrian Allcroft - Earthwork of England: Prehistoric, Roman, Saxon, Danish, Norman, and Mediæval.
 Joseph Déchelette begins publishing his Manuel d'Archéologie Préhistorique, Celtique, et Gallo-romaine.

Finds
 3 July: Phaistos Disc.
 3 August: "La Chapelle-aux-Saints 1", a 56,000- to 47,000-year-old Neanderthal adult male skeleton, is found at La Chapelle-aux-Saints in central France by Amédée and Jean Bouyssonie and L. Bardon.
 A 40,000-year-old Neanderthal boy skeleton is found at Le Moustier in southwest France by Otto Hauser.
 Venus of Willendorf found by Josef Szombath.
 The largest ever coin hoard is found, 150,000 13th century silver pennies in Brussels.

Births
 November 25: Jia Lanpo, Chinese prehistorian (died 2001)
 December 17: Willard Frank Libby, American developer of radiocarbon dating (died 1980)

Deaths
 May 31: Sir John Evans, English archaeologist (born 1823)
 Frank Calvert, English archaeologist (born 1828)

References

Archaeology
Archaeology
Archaeology by year